Ermont-Halte is a railway station in the commune of Ermont (Val-d'Oise department), France. The station is served by Transilien Paris Nord (line H) trains from Paris to Persan-Beaumont via Saint-Leu-la-Forêt. In 2003 there were between 7,500 and 15,000 passengers per day. The station has free parking for 200 vehicles. Ermont-Halte is located on the line from Ermont-Eaubonne to Valmondois, that was opened in 1876. The line was electrified in 1970.

See also
List of SNCF stations in Île-de-France

References

External links

 

Railway stations in Val-d'Oise
Railway stations in France opened in 1876